Wolverhampton Girls' High School is a grammar school for girls in Wolverhampton in the West Midlands of England.

Overview
Wolverhampton Girls' High School, founded in 1911, educates girls from the age of 11 to 18. There are some 1015 girls enrolled, including about two hundred in the sixth form. It was previously awarded the status of Language College in the UK's Specialist Schools Programme, and converted to academy status on 1 April 2014.

Entrance
Entry to the school is via the Shropshire, Walsall and Wolverhampton Grammar Schools Consortium (Adams' Grammar, Newport Girls High, Queen Mary Grammar and High School and Wolverhampton Girls High School), testing Maths, English, verbal and non-verbal reasoning. These tests take place during Year 6 of primary education (in September). 11+ examinations must be taken in order to be enrolled in the school.

Curriculum
There used to be four forms according to which house a student belonged to, however the school now has five forms in each year. Subjects are taught in form groups in years 7 to 9 and then in option groups for the more senior years.

Girls take English and at least three foreign languages, religious studies, history, geography, mathematics, physics, biology, chemistry, technology, information technology, art, music and physical education. Foreign languages are chosen from French, German, Latin, Russian and Spanish. More recently, students have started to take one major European language and one language with a different writing system in year 7, then to begin Latin in year 8.

At GCSE level, alongside English, mathematics, biology, chemistry and physics, students are required to take at least one foreign language, and one of geography, history, and religious studies. Further, girls take two more subjects of their choice, and in year 11 are given the option to take GCSE-level further mathematics if they desire.

Results
The school has been producing high results for many years and has frequently been ranked within the top 10 state schools in the country for its performance at GCSE and A level. Over 80% of GCSE grades are either A or A*, with the majority of pupils gaining nine or more GCSEs at these grades.

The 2006 A-level results placed the school in fifth place in the performance league table for all maintained schools in the West Midlands.

In 2009, 100% of girls who sat GCSE examinations gained 5 or more A*–C GCSEs.

Since the 2017 GCSE reforms, WGHS has continued to perform highly in subjects. Notably, in 2019, three-quarters of results were a grade 7 to 9, and 87% of students achieved at least a grade 4 in all 5 EBacc subjects.

Notable former pupils

Lindsay Ashford, author
Narinder Dhami, author
Jacqueline Elledge, England cricketer
 Wendy Flavell, professor of surface physics at the University of Manchester
Helene Hayman, Baroness Hayman, Labour politician, first Lord Speaker of the House of Lords
Rachael Heyhoe-Flint, captain of the England women's cricket team
Ann Jago, England cricketer
Betty Joseph (1917-2013), British psychoanalyst
Caitlin Moran, author and journalist
Pauline Perry, Baroness Perry of Southwark, Conservative politician and educationalist
Patience Wheatcroft, Baroness Wheatcroft, journalist and Conservative peer, former editor of The Sunday Telegraph and Wall Street Journal Europe
Anne Rafferty, High Court judge
Sarah Clarke, first woman to be appointed Black Rod in the UK Parliament
Constance Wood, pioneer of radiotherapy
Jane Stevenson, Conservative Member of Parliament for Wolverhampton North East and Councillor for Tettenhall Wightwick

References

External links
Wolverhampton Girls' High School - official web site
WGHS OGU - Wolverhampton Girls’ High Old Girls’ Union website

Girls' schools in the West Midlands (county)
Grammar schools in Wolverhampton
Educational institutions established in 1911
1911 establishments in England
Academies in Wolverhampton